Frontiers in Psychology is a peer-reviewed open-access academic journal covering all aspects of psychology. It was established in 2010 and is published by Frontiers Media. The editor-in-chief is Axel Cleeremans (Université libre de Bruxelles).

Abstracting and indexing
The journal is abstracted and indexed in Current Contents/Social & Behavioral Sciences, EBSCO databases, PsycINFO, and Scopus.  

According to the Journal Citation Reports, the journal has a 2021 impact factor of 4.232. Since 2016, the journal has a score of 2 in the Norwegian Scientific Index, which "covers the most prestigious and rigorous channels, which publish 20 per cent of the publications".

Controversies
In February 2013, Frontiers published a study by Stephan Lewandowsky and co-authors which analysed conspiracy theory explanations given in blog responses to an earlier paper about conspiracy theories and support for free-market economics as predictors of a climate change denial stance. In March 2014, Frontiers retracted the study, and it made a statement that they had received "a small number of complaints". Their detailed investigation "did not identify any issues with the academic and ethical aspects of the study. It did, however, determine that the legal context is insufficiently clear and therefore Frontiers wishes to retract the published article;" the DeSmogBlog said that the main legal concern was whether it was potentially defamatory for the paper to link climate change denialism to conspiracy theorists. There were public concerns about the "chilling effect" of the decision on research. On 4 April 2014 Costanza Zucca, editorial director of the journal, and Fred Fenter, executive editor, issued a statement saying that Frontiers did not cave in to threats, and it in fact received no threats. The statement gave the main reason for retraction as insufficient protection for the rights of the studied subjects. There was public discussion about apparent contradictions between the statements issued by the journal. And the authors of the paper disputed points raised in the second statement.

Frontiers Media was included in Jeffrey Beall's list of "potential, possible, or probable predatory publishers" before Beall took the decision to shut down his website, though both COPE and OASPA have stated that they have no concerns with Frontiers' membership of their organizations.

References

External links 

 

Psychology journals
English-language journals
Publications established in 2010
Creative Commons-licensed journals
Frontiers Media academic journals